Hildegard (c. 754 – 30 April 783), was a Frankish queen consort who was the second wife of Charlemagne and mother of Louis the Pious. Little is known about her life because like all other women related to Charlemagne, she became notable only from a political background with records on her parentage, wedding, death and role as a mother.

Origins

She was the daughter of the Germanic Count Gerold of Kraichgau (founder of the Udalriching family) and his wife Emma, in turn daughter of Duke Nebe (Hnabi) of Alemannia and Hereswintha vom Bodensee (of Lake Constance). Hildegard's father had extensive possessions in the dominion of Charlemagne's younger brother Carloman, so this union was of significant importance for Charlemagne, because he could strengthen its position in the east of the Rhine and also could bind the Alemannian nobility to his side.

Life

It is unknown if Charlemagne planned his marriage before the sudden death of Carloman or was just a part of the purposeful incorporation of his younger brother's Kingdom, in detriment of the claims of his nephews. In any event, the wedding between Charlemagne and Hildegard took place at Aix-la-Chapelle certainly before 30 April 771, after the repudiation of the Lombardian princess Desiderata, Charlemagne's previous wife.

It is generally accepted that she was either 12 or 13 upon her marriage to Charlemagne., though her nominal date of birth would place her at 17. Girls could be married at any time after puberty, and in Roman law, which the Church upheld, the age of 12 was well established as being adequate. An intense physical relationship between the spouses was demonstrated by the fact that, during her 12 years of marriage, Hildegard had 8 pregnancies (including one set of twins). Quite remarkably, the chronicles never mention either miscarriages or stillbirths, indicating that she was of sturdy health despite her young age at the time of the wedding. Some children she had died, though as babies soon after birth.

Hildegard accompanied Charlemagne on many of his military campaigns. She gave birth to her second child and first daughter, Adelaide, during the siege of Pavia, capital of the Kingdom of the Lombards (September 773/June 774), but the child died during the return journey to France. In 778, Hildegard accompanied her husband as far as Aquitaine, where she gave birth to twin boys Louis and Lothair. In 780/781, she traveled with Charlemagne and four of their children to Rome, where the sons Louis and Carloman (the latter renamed Pepin after his baptism by Pope Adrian I) were appointed sub-kings of Aquitaine and Italy respectively. This contributed to the strengthening of the alliance between the Carolingians and the Papacy. Because of her frequent pregnancies, it can be presumed that Hildegard accompanied her husband on further campaigns, at least temporarily. As a mother, Hildegard was a very big influence on her kids religiously. She helped mold her family into the Christian family that Charlemagne wanted while he was off on campaigns.

During the time she was pregnant with the twins in 778, Hildegard dove into her interest with astronomy. While with Charlemagne on his Spanish campaign, it is believed that she was the "Astronomer" that is mentioned. The person we think was Hildegard, mapped the locations of where Charlemagne was camped along his marches. 

Hildegard died on 30 April 783, according to Paul the Deacon, in the wake of her last childbirth. She was buried the following day (1 May 783) in the Abbey of Saint-Arnould in Metz. Following the wishes of Charlemagne, near her grave were burning candles and daily prayers were said for her soul.

Ecclesiastical Patron 

Hildegard made several donations to the monasteries of St. Denis and St. Martin of Tours. She was a friend of Saint Leoba, who reportedly lived some time with her at court. She intervened in Hildegard's religious education and also offered her spiritual advice. Together with her husband she commissioned the Godescalc Evangelistary, where for the first time she was explicitly mentioned as Queen -also of the Lombards- through the joint signature of documents with her husband.

Hildegard enjoyed in her own lifetime from a high reputation, as was demonstrated in her obituary written by Paul the Deacon. However, these compliments are to be regarded with some skepticism. In her Epitaph were included phrases that may have been introduced to flatter Charlemagne: for example, the reference to the fact that Hildegard was the epitome of beauty, wisdom and virtue. This were common words used by medieval writers to their rulers. Pope Adrian I, in a letter to Charlemagne, expressed his condolences over the untimely death of Hildegard.

Together with her husband, she was the main benefactress of the Monastery of Kempten (founded in 752), who received financial and political support. From Italy they brought after the conquest of the Kingdom of the Lombards in 773/774 the relics of the Roman martyrs Saints Gordianus and Epimachus to Kempten, whom, along with the Virgin Mary, are the patrons of the monastery.

Hildegard was extensively mentioned in Kempten as one of the founders; her bust graced the pin crest and some coins of the later Imperial Abbey. In the late Middle Ages it was alleged that Hildegard was buried in Kempten, as well as her son Louis the Pious; there was built the so-called Hildegard Chapel (Hildegardkapelle), which quickly became a place of pilgrimage and where several miracles are reported. This explains why the Queen was revered as a saint in the Allgäu and always presented with an aureola. In the 17th century the building of another Hildegard Chapel at the Fürstäbtliche of Kempten was projected, but this was abandoned after the secularization.

Even in modern times, the memory of Hildegard and her importance in the urban development at Kempten is still very noticeable: The central square in front of St. Lorenz Basilica was named the Hildegard Square (Hildegardplatz) in her honor. In 1862 a Neo-Gothic Hildegard fountain (Hildegardsbrunnen) was erected in the square, which was closed in the 1950s. An idealized portrait painted by Franz Weiß was part of the facade of the local Landhaus. Also, in 1874 was founded the Hildegardis-Gymnasium Kempten Lyceum, originally exclusively for girls. At the Lindau Road, close to the school, was also located another Hildegard Fountain. On the facades of some houses were shown the image of the Queen, and on the edge of the Kempten forest there was the Hildegard Oak (Hildegardseiche) for several years until it was replaced by a new plantation. Until the 1950s, many girls born in Kempten were named after Hildegard.

Political Life 
Hildegard used her position as Queen consort to obtain for her siblings several territorial and monetary benefits; as far was known, she was the only of Charlemagne's wives or concubines who managed to obtain for a relative an office after her marriage. In addition, was also assumed that she, like other medieval queens, held several roles, such as ruling the court or being the representative (or regent) of the sovereign during his absence. This could mean that she was in close contact with all the government decision of her husband.

Contextualization 
In a time when polygamy was very common, Hildegard was married to Charlemagne as a monogamous wife until her death. She has mostly been looked upon as only a wife and mother and nothing more, much like the women who lived at this time no matter the class. But she was more than that. Her life was more defined by what she did rather than what she was. When Charlemagne married her, he was coming out of his second divorce. She was his first wife that he stayed with till she died. This started a trend of Charlemagne staying with whoever he was married to for his last three wives.

Children

Although Charlemagne already had an older son (Pepin the Hunchback) from his first union with Himiltrude, he was not considered an heir after the rebellion in which he participated in 792. In his will of 806 (the called Divisio Regnorum), he divided his domains between the three surviving sons of Hildegard. Because her son, Louis the Pious , succeeded Charlemagne as Emperor, Hildegard is often called "mother of Kings and Emperors".

 Charles (772/773 – 4 December 811 in Bavaria), the eldest son according to Paul the Deacon, who recorded his parentage. His father associated him in the government of Francia and Saxony in 790, and crowned joint King of the Franks at Rome on 25 December 800, but died before his father.
  Adelaide (September 773/June 774 in Italy – July/August 774, buried Metz, Abbey of Saint-Arnould). Born during the siege of Pavia, she was named after an early deceased sister of Charlemagne. She died during the return journey to France. She is named daughter of King Charles by Paul the Deacon, when recording her place of burial, who also wrote an epitaph to "Adeleidis filia Karoli regis" specifying that she was born in Italy.
 Rotrude (775 – 6 June 810), named after her paternal great-grandmother. "Hruodrudem et Bertham et Gislam" are named daughters of King Charles and Hildegard by Einhard.<ref>Einhardi Vita Karoli Imperator 18, 'Monumenta Germaniæ Historica Scriptorum II, p. 453.</ref> Angilbert's poem Ad Pippinum Italiæ regum names (in order) "Chrodthrudis...Berta...Gisla et Theodrada" as daughters of King Charles. She was betrothed in 781 with Constantine VI, Emperor of Byzantium, and received the name Erythro in preparation for her future wedding. The betrothal was broken in 787, and she, like all her sisters, remained unmarried. From a liaison with Rorgo of Rennes she had one son, the latter Louis, Abbot of Saint-Denis.
 Carloman (777 – 8 July 810 in Milan, buried Verona, San Zeno Maggiore), renamed Pepin in Rome on 15 April 781 by Pope Adrian I, and crowned King of Italy that day. He also predeceased his father.
 Louis (Chasseneuil-du-Poitou, Vienne, 16 April/September 778 – 20 June 840 in Ingelheim, buried Metz, Abbey of Saint-Arnould). He is named, and his parentage recorded, by Paul the Deacon, which specifies that he was his parents' third son, born a twin with Lothair. Crowned King of Aquitaine in Rome on 15 April 781 by Pope Adrian I, his father named him as his successor at Aix-la-Chapelle, crowning him as joint Holy Roman Emperor on 11 September 813.
 Lothair (Chasseneuil-du-Poitou, Vienne, 16 April/September 778 – 779/80). He is named, and his parentage recorded, by Paul the Deacon, which specifies that he was his parents' fourth son "qui biennis occubuit", born a twin with Louis, and also wrote an epitaph to "Chlodarii pueri regis" naming "Karolus...rex genitorque tuus, genitrix regina...Hildigarda" and specifying that he was a twin.
 Bertha (779/80 – after 11 March 824), named after her paternal grandmother. An offer by Offa of Mercia to arrange a marriage between her and his son, Ecgfrith, led to Charlemagne breaking off diplomatic relations with Britain in 790, and banning British ships from his ports. Like her sisters, she never married, but from her liaison with Angilbert, a court official, she had two sons: Hartnid (about whom little is known) and the historian Nithard, Abbott of St. Riquier.
 Gisela (before May 781 – after 800, maybe after 814). Named after her surviving paternal aunt, she was baptized in Milan in May 781.
 Hildegard (March/April 783 in Thionville – 1/8 June 783, buried Metz, Abbey of Saint-Arnould), named after her mother (an unusual practice at that time), she is named daughter of King Charles by Paul the Deacon, when recording her place of burial, and also wrote an epitaph to "Hildegardis filiæ [Karoli regis]" specifying that she lived 40 days and her mother died after giving birth to her.

 Veneration 

Hildegard of the Vinzgau is honored in the Catholic Church on 30 April.

Sources

 Einhard: Vita Karoli Magni (Chapter 18).
 Notker the Stammerer: Gesta Karoli Magni (Book I, Chapter 4)
 Paul the Deacon: Epitaphium Hildegardis reginae
 Royal Frankish Annals (years 780, 781 and 783)
 Thegan of Trier: Vita Hludowici (Chapter 2)
 Annales Mettenses priores (years 780 and 783)
 Annales mosellaniEpitaphium Hildegardis reginae

Note: translated with help from the footnotes recorded in Karl Neff: Critical and explanatory edition of the poems of Paul the Deacon in: Sources and Studies on Latin Philology of the Middle Ages, Ludwig Traube, 3rd volume, 4th book, Munich 1908 (ed.)

References

Bibliography
 Reinhard Barth: Karl der Große, Munich 2000.
 Matthias Becher: Karl der Große, Munich 1999.
 Hans-Werner Goetz: Frauen im frühen Mittelalter. Frauenbild und Frauenleben im Frankenreich, Weimar (u.a.) 1995.
 Achim Thomas Hack: Alter, Krankheit, Tod und Herrschaft im frühen Mittelalter, (=  Monographien zur Geschichte des Mittelalters 56), Stuttgart 2009.
 Martina Hartmann: Die Königin im frühen Mittelalter, Stuttgart 2009.
 : Karl der Große, Stuttgart 2010.
 Ingrid Heidrich: Von Plectrud zu Hildegard. Beobachtungen zum Besitzrecht adliger Frauen im Frankenreich des 7. und 8. Jahrhunderts und zur politischen Rolle der Frauen, in: Rheinische Vierteljahresblätter 52 (1988), pp. 1–15.
 Silvia Konecny: Die Frauen des karolingischen Königshauses. Die politische Bedeutung der Ehe und die Stellung der Frau in der fränkischen Herrscherfamilie vom 7. bis zum 10. Jahrhundert, Vienna 1976.
 Rosamond McKitterick: Karl der Grosse, Darmstadt 2008.
 Michael Richter: Karl der Große und seine Ehefrauen. Zu einigen dunkleren Seiten Karls des Großen anhand von Quellen des ausgehenden achten und beginnenden neunten Jahrhunderts. pp 17–24, in: Franz-Reiner Erkens (ed.): Karl der Große und das Erbe der Kulturen, Berlin 2001.
 Rudolf Schieffer: Die Karolinger, 3rd revised Edition, Stuttgart 2000.
 Klaus Schreiner: „Hildegardis regina“. Wirklichkeit und Legende einer karolingischen Herrscherin, in: Archiv für Kulturgeschichte'' 57 (1975), pp. 1–70.

|-

Udalriching dynasty
750s births
783 deaths
Wives of Charlemagne
8th-century Frankish nobility
8th-century Christian saints
Saints from the Carolingian Empire
Medieval French saints
Female saints of medieval France
French Roman Catholic saints
Christian royal saints
Roman Catholic royal saints